A tensor is an algebraic object that describes a multilinear relationship between sets of algebraic objects related to a vector space.

Tensor may also refer to:

Mathematics
 Tensor (intrinsic definition)
 Tensor field
 Tensor product
 Tensor (obsolete), the norm used on the quaternion algebra in William Rowan Hamilton's work; see 
 Symmetric tensor, a tensor that is invariant under a permutation of its vector arguments

Computer science
 Tensor (machine learning), the application of tensors to artificial neural networks
 Tensor Processing Unit, an integrated circuit developed by Google for neural network machine learning
 Google Tensor, a system on a chip (Soc) found on the Pixel 6 and Pixel 6 Pro smartphones
 TensorFlow, a technology developed by Google

Other uses
 Tensor Trucks, a skateboarding truck company

See also
 Tensor muscle (disambiguation)
 Tensor type, in tensor analysis
 :Category: Tensors
 Glossary of tensor theory
 Curvature tensor (disambiguation)
 Stress tensor (disambiguation)
 Tense (disambiguation)